The following list includes names of Croatian saints, beati and candidates for sainthood of the Catholic Church.

Early Christian saints
List of early Christian saints who were born in the territory of present-day Croatia:
 Donatus of Zadar
 Saint Domnius
 St. Eleutherius
 Pollio of Cybalae
 Gaudentius of Brescia
 Jerome
 St. Julian
 Pope Caius
 Quirinus of Sescia
 Saint Marinus
 Maurus of Parentium
 Saint Silvan
 Saint Vincenca

Saints
 Marko Krizin
 Leopold Mandić
 Nicholas Tavelic
 John of Trogir

Beati
 Miroslav Bulešić
 Blessed Martyrs of Drina
 Julijan of Bale
 Augustin Kažotić
 Francesco Bonifacio
 Catherine of Bosnia
 Gratia of Kotor
 Ivan Merz
 Oton of Pula
 Marija Petković
 Aloysius Stepinac
 Jakov Varingez
 Serafin Kodić Glasnović
 Anton Muzić

Candidates
 Ante Antić
 Petar Barbarić
 Nikola Bijanković
 Didak Buntić
 Aleksa Benigar
 Klaudija Böllein
 Egidije Bulešić
 Giacoma Giorgia Colombis
 Vjeko Ćurić
 Šimun Filipović
 Ante Gabrić
 Hercegovinian Franciscan Martyrs
 Zita of Bourbon-Parma
 Žarka Ivasić
 Josip Lang
 Marija Krucifiksa Kozulić
 Stjepan Kranjčić
 Franjo Kuharić
 Antun Mahnić
 Ana Marija Marović
 Lino Maupas
 Alojzije Palić
 Bonifacije Pavletić
 Ivo Peran
 Antun Rendić
 Josip Stadler
 Marica Stanković
 Gerard Tomo Stantić
 Ante Josip Tomičić
 Marko Tvrdeić
 Vendelin Vošnjak
 Klara Žižić

Others
 Marijan Blažić
 Juraj Gospodnetić
 Rafael Kalinić
 Lovro Karaula
 Pavao Kolarić
 Lovro Milanović
 Petar Perica
 Bernardin Tomašić
 Anđeo Zvizdović
 Benedikt of Dubrovnik
 Slavko Barbarić
 Josip Belović 
 Petar Berislavić
 Ruđer Bošković 
 Martin Borković
 Fulgencije Carev
 Marija Leopoldina Čović
 Matija Divković
 Rudolf Eckert
 Filip Grabovac
 Julijan Jelenić
 Andrija Kačić Miošić
 Antun Kanižlić
 Marko Marulić
 Lino Maupas
 Pope Nicholas IV
 Mihovil Pavlinović
 Ivo Protulipac
 Stjepan Sećak
 Dinko Vranković 
 Frane Vlašić
 Ana Katarina Zrinski
 Feliks Niedzielski

References

 

Saints
Croatian

Saints
Saints